Ironstone is a sedimentary rock, either deposited directly as a ferruginous sediment or created by chemical replacement, that contains a substantial proportion of an iron ore compound from which iron (Fe) can be smelted commercially. Not to be confused with native or telluric iron, which is very rare and found in metallic form, the term ironstone is customarily restricted to hard, coarsely banded, non-banded, and non-cherty sedimentary rocks of post-Precambrian age. The Precambrian deposits, which have a different origin, are generally known as banded iron formations. The iron minerals comprising ironstones can consist either of oxides, i.e. limonite, hematite, and magnetite; carbonates, i.e. siderite; silicates, i.e. chamosite; or some combination of these minerals.

Description
Freshly cleaved ironstone is usually grey. The brown external appearance is due to oxidation of its surface. 
Ironstone, being a sedimentary rock is not always homogeneous, and can be found in a red and black banded form called tiger iron, sometimes used for jewelry purposes.

Sometimes ironstone hosts concretions or opal gems.

Occurrence
Ironstone occurs in a variety of forms. The various forms of ironstone include siderite nodules; deeply weathered saprolite, i.e. (laterite); and ooidal ironstone.

Uses

Ironstone as a source of iron
Ironstone, although widespread, is a limited source of iron. Historically, most British iron originated from ironstone, but it is now rarely used for this purpose because it is far too limited in quantity to be an economic source of iron ore.

Ceramics
Ironstone's oxide impurities render it useless as a component in ceramics: the   "ironstone china" of Staffordshire and American manufacture, a fine white high-fired vitreous semi-porcelain, commonly used for heavy-duty dinner services in the 19th century, includes no ironstone in its production. Its "iron" quality is in its resistance to chipping.

In construction
The stone can be used as a building material. Examples include the parish churches at Kirby Bellars and South Croxton in Leicestershire, and Eydon Hall in Northamptonshire.

See also
 Iron ore
 Iron-rich sedimentary rocks
 Oxfordshire Ironstone Railway
 Ironsand

References

Sedimentary rocks
Iron ores